Godamaditta Grama Niladhari Division is a Grama Niladhari Division of the Kothmale Divisional Secretariat of Nuwara Eliya District of Central Province, Sri Lanka. It has Grama Niladhari Division Code 462B.

Godamaditta is a surrounded by the Dombagasthalawa, Katugolla, Thispane Kanda, Wataddara and Rojersangama North Grama Niladhari Divisions.

Demographics

Ethnicity 
The Godamaditta Grama Niladhari Division has a Sinhalese majority (95.4%). In comparison, the Kothmale Divisional Secretariat (which contains the Godamaditta Grama Niladhari Division) has a Sinhalese majority (52.6%) and a significant Indian Tamil population (36.4%)

Religion 
The Godamaditta Grama Niladhari Division has a Buddhist majority (95.4%). In comparison, the Kothmale Divisional Secretariat (which contains the Godamaditta Grama Niladhari Division) has a Buddhist majority (52.3%) and a significant Hindu population (36.5%)

References 

Grama Niladhari Divisions of Kothmale Divisional Secretariat